Larba Yarga was the Minister of Justice for Burkina Faso until approximately 2000. He also served as a member of the Pan-African Parliament from Burkina Faso.

References

Living people
Members of the Pan-African Parliament from Burkina Faso
Year of birth missing (living people)
Justice ministers of Burkina Faso
21st-century Burkinabé people